Nuris Arias Doñé (born May 20, 1973 in San Cristobal) is a retired volleyball player from the Dominican Republic, who won the gold medal with the women's national team at the 2003 Pan American Games in her home town of Santo Domingo, Dominican Republic.

Career
At the 2000 USA Volleyball Open Championships won by her team, Arias was selected among the All-Tournament team.

Playing as a wing-spiker she also competed at the 2006 FIVB Women's World Championship for her native country, wearing the #9 jersey.

Clubs
  San Cristóbal (-1998)
  Marsì Palermo (1998–1999)
  Olimpia Teodora Ravenna (1999–2000)
  Rio Marsì Pa (2000–2001)
  Pallavolo Palermo (2001–2002)
  Universidad de Burgos (2002–2003)
  Gelati Gelma Seap Aragona (2003–2004)
  Mirador (2006)
  Zoppas Industries Conegliano (2006–2007)
  Infotel Banca Di Forlì (2007–2008)
  Distrito Nacional (2008)
  Riso Scotti Pavia (2008–2009)

Awards

Individuals
 2000 USA Open Championships "All-Tournament Team"
 2008 Dominican Volleyball League "Best Attacker"

Clubs
 2003 Spanish Queen Cup –  Runner-Up, with Universidad de Burgos
 2006 Dominican Republic Distrito Nacional Superior Tournament –  Champion, with Mirador
 2008 Dominican Republic Volleyball League –  Champion, with Distrito Nacional

References

External links
 FIVB profile
 CEV profile
 Italian League profile
 CV Diegos Porcelos

1973 births
Living people
Dominican Republic women's volleyball players
Volleyball players at the 2003 Pan American Games
Pan American Games gold medalists for the Dominican Republic
Pan American Games medalists in volleyball
Central American and Caribbean Games gold medalists for the Dominican Republic
Central American and Caribbean Games silver medalists for the Dominican Republic
Competitors at the 1998 Central American and Caribbean Games
Competitors at the 2002 Central American and Caribbean Games
Competitors at the 2006 Central American and Caribbean Games
Wing spikers
Expatriate volleyball players in Italy
Expatriate volleyball players in Spain
Dominican Republic expatriates in Italy
Dominican Republic expatriate sportspeople in Spain
Central American and Caribbean Games medalists in volleyball
Medalists at the 2003 Pan American Games